West Buckland is a village and civil parish in Somerset, England, situated  south west of Taunton in the Somerset West and Taunton district.  The parish has a population of 1,189.

History
In 904, certain lands were the basis of a charter to Asser, Bishop of Sherborne, later confirmed in 908. It is thought that Buckland was perhaps known then as Bocland; the name for ‘chartered land’. Following this charter, or even earlier, the name West Buckland was established. But why West was added is unknown – perhaps to distinguish it from Buckland St Mary to the east.

The parish of West Buckland was part of the Kingsbury Hundred.

Buckland or Minchin Buckland Priory was founded as a house of St John the Baptist around 1166 for Augustinian canons. The buildings burned down in 1234.

Gerbestone Manor was largely rebuilt in the late 16th century, although some fabric from the 13th century house remains. It is a Grade II* listed building. The house has been owned by a succession of families of local gentry and is now used as a wedding venue and for corporate events. The main two-storey chert stone building is accompanied by various outbuildings including barns and a mill.

Governance
The parish council has responsibility for local issues, including setting an annual precept (local rate) to cover the council’s operating costs and producing annual accounts for public scrutiny. The parish council evaluates local planning applications and works with the local police, district council officers, and neighbourhood watch groups on matters of crime, security, and traffic. The parish council's role also includes initiating projects for the maintenance and repair of parish facilities, as well as consulting with the district council on the maintenance, repair, and improvement of highways, drainage, footpaths, public transport, and street cleaning. Conservation matters (including trees and listed buildings) and environmental issues are also the responsibility of the council.

The village falls within the Non-metropolitan district of Somerset West and Taunton, having formally been a part of Taunton Deane which was formed on 1 April 1974 under the Local Government Act 1972, and having previously been part of Wellington Rural District. The district council is responsible for local planning and building control, local roads, council housing, environmental health, markets and fairs, refuse collection and recycling, cemeteries and crematoria, leisure services, parks, and tourism.

Somerset County Council is responsible for running the largest and most expensive local services such as education, social services, libraries, main roads, public transport, policing and  fire services, trading standards, waste disposal and strategic planning.

The appropriate electoral ward is called 'Monument'. Although West Buckland is the most populous area the ward goes west to Sampford Arundel. The total population of this ward taken at the 2011 Census was 2,184.

It is also part of the Taunton Deane county constituency represented in the House of Commons of the Parliament of the United Kingdom. It elects one Member of Parliament (MP) by the first past the post system of election.

Religious sites
The parish Church of St Mary has 13th-century origins and has been designated as a Grade I listed building.

References

External links

Villages in Taunton Deane
Civil parishes in Somerset